Clematis Station is situated on the Puffing Billy Railway.

It was opened on 10 March 1902 as Paradise Valley. The name was shortened to Paradise in 1908 and renamed Clematis in 1921.

Trains rarely stop here, except by prior arrangement, often for groups travelling to the Paradise Hotel (behind the station).  Clematis contains a small loop siding with a dead end spur, which are Staff operated.

External links
 Melway map at street-directory.com.au

Tourist railway stations in Melbourne
Railway stations in the Shire of Yarra Ranges